Tampa Preparatory School is a 6–12 private, co-educational middle and high college-preparatory school in Tampa, Florida, United States. It was established in 1974.

The school is accredited by the Southern Association of Colleges and Schools and the Florida Council of Independent Schools, and is a member of the National Association of Independent Schools, the College Board, the Secondary School Admissions Test Board, the National Association of College Admissions Counseling, the Southern Association of College Admissions Counseling, and the Educational Records Bureau.

History 
Tampa Preparatory School was established in 1974. In 1991 seventh and eighth grades were added and in 1997 the school began offering classes for the 6th grade. In 2002 the school moved to its new site across the street from the University of Tampa, whose campus it once shared.

Campus 
The school's  campus includes a  school complex including a  sports complex. Both the Middle and Upper Schools feature Active Learning Environments (ALEs). The Peifer Library houses over 12,000 books and periodicals. Tampa Preparatory School opened a new Student Center in January 2013.

Athletics 
Tampa Prep is a member of the Florida High School Athletic Association and fields teams in sports including lacrosse, baseball, bowling, cross-country, swimming and diving, crew, volleyball, soccer, basketball, track and field, golf, tennis, wrestling, and softball. Tampa Prep also partakes in an annual event against rival Berkeley Preparatory School called the Headmaster's Challenge taking place every year during the winter athletic season. This event includes sports such as basketball, soccer, and wrestling.

Notable alumni
 Jay Bowie, professional basketball player
 Chris Colwill, U.S. Olympic diver
 Casey Sanders, professional basketball player
 Andrew Samuels, professional soccer player

References

External links 
 

High schools in Hillsborough County, Florida
High schools in Tampa, Florida
Private middle schools in Florida
Private high schools in Florida
Preparatory schools in Florida
Educational institutions established in 1974
1974 establishments in Florida